Hombres y Héroes was a series of comics whose original series were published every Wednesday in Mexico after 1987. Its themes revolved around historical events or individuals, as well as fictitious or mythological characters. The first of the series lasted from 1987 until 1994 reaching over 400 individual titles.  When its publishing house Novedades Editores disappeared, the publishing house that followed it, NIESA, revived the series, republishing some of the previous titles. The new version, however, was smaller and of lower quality than the original.  It was also published biweekly, usually on Mondays, rather than weekly as the previous series had been. This new version began in 1998.

Original Series

Second Series

References 

Mexican comics
Mexican comics titles